Defending champion Barbora Krejčíková and her partner Nikola Mektić defeated Bethanie Mattek-Sands and Jamie Murray in the final, 5–7, 6–4, [10–1] to win the mixed doubles tennis title at the 2020 Australian Open.

Krejčíková and Rajeev Ram were the reigning champions, but Ram chose not to participate.

Seeds

Draw

Finals

Top half

Bottom half

Other entry information

Wild cards

Alternate pairs

Withdrawals

References
 Main Draw

External links
 2020 Australian Open – Doubles draws and results at the International Tennis Federation

Mixed Doubles
Australian Open - Mixed Doubles
Australian Open - Mixed Doubles
Australian Open (tennis) by year – Mixed doubles